Zahir Pajaziti (1 November 1962 – 31 January 1997) was an Albanian commander of the Kosovo Liberation Army (KLA). He was the first Commander of the KLA, known as "First Gun of Freedom". He was killed on 31 January 1997 in a gunfight with Serbian forces.

After the breakup of Yugoslavia in 1992, Pajaziti remained in Kosovo while battles raged in Croatia and Bosnia and Herzegovina. At the Tirana military academy in Albania he undertook military training and later with the ascension of Sali Berisha to power, his government arrested Pajaziti in 1995. Later at two secret camps in Tropojë and Kukës owned by the Albanian army close to the Albania-Kosovo border, Pajaziti along with Agim Ramadani and Sali Çekaj organised military training for Kosovan Albanians. Pajaziti joined the Kosovo Liberation Army (KLA) in 1997. He and his group developed in the Llap region of Kosovo. Pajaziti, Sali Çekaj and Adem Jashari were the leaders of the first Kosovo military groups, which were trained in Albania in 1991–1992. Pajaziti became the KLA commander for the Podujevo area and his deputy was Hakif Zejnullahu. He was part of the KLA main staff. Later that year, he was killed in a gunfight in Vushtrri with the Yugoslav army.

In 2008, the president of Kosovo, Fatmir Sejdiu, declared Pajaziti a Hero of Kosovo. He is commemorated by a statue on Mother Teresa Boulevard in Pristina.

References

Further reading

1962 births
1997 deaths
Kosovo Liberation Army soldiers
20th-century Albanian people
People from Podujevo
Kosovo Albanians
Guerrillas killed in action
Deaths by firearm in Serbia